

A bicentennial or bicentenary is the two-hundredth anniversary of a part, or the celebrations thereof.  It may refer to:

Europe
French Revolution bicentennial, commemorating the 200th anniversary of 14 July 1789 uprising, celebrated in 1989
Bicentennial of the Kingdom of the Netherlands, 2013–2015

United States
 George Washington Bicentennial, commemorating the 200th birthday of the United States' first president, celebrated in 1932
 United States Bicentennial, the 200th anniversary of the adoption of the Declaration of Independence, celebrated in 1976
 Abraham Lincoln Bicentennial, commemorating the 200th birthday of the United States' 16th president, celebrated in 2009

Latin America
Argentina Bicentennial, commemorating the 200th anniversary of the Revolución de Mayo,  celebrated in 2010
Bicentennial of Chile, commemorating the 200th anniversary of the beginning of the independence process in Chile, with the first Government Junta of Chile established on September 18, 1810, celebrated in 2010
Celebration of Mexican political anniversaries in 2010, commemorating the 200th anniversary of the Mexican War of Independence; also, the 100th anniversary of the 1910 Mexican Revolution
Uruguay Bicentennial of the Battle of Las Piedras, celebrated in 2011

Other
Australian Bicentenary, celebrated in 1970 and 1988
Bicentennial of the Encyclopædia Britannica, celebrated in 1968
War of 1812 Bicentennial
 Bicentennial of the Founding of Modern Singapore in 2019

See also
 Bicentennial Park (disambiguation)